This is a list of Tamil language television channels in India.

Government Owned Channels

General Entertainment

Movies

Audio Feeds

Music

Classic

News

Comedy

Kids

Audio Feeds
Cartoon Network - with Tamil audio feed
Discovery Kids - with Tamil audio feed
Disney Channel - with Tamil audio feed
Disney Junior - with Tamil audio feed
Hungama TV - with Tamil audio feed
Nickelodeon - with Tamil audio feed
Nickelodeon Sonic - with Tamil audio feed
Pogo - with Tamil audio feed
Sony Yay - with Tamil audio feed
Super Hungama - with Tamil audio feed

Sports
Sony Ten 4 - with Tamil audio feed
Star Sports 1 Tamil - separate channel for Tamil, part of  Star India

Infotainment
Animal Planet - with Tamil audio feed
Discovery Channel HD - with Tamil audio feed (HD Version)
D Tamil (Discovery Tamil) - separate channel for Tamil, part of Discovery Networks Asia Pacific
Fox Life - with Tamil audio feed
National Geographic - with Tamil audio feed
Nat Geo Wild - with Tamil audio feed
Sony BBC Earth - with Tamil audio feed
Travel XP Tamil - separate channel for Tamil, part of Celebrities Management Private Limited

Shopping
HomeShop18 Tamil - 24X7 Home Shopping Channel
Music Zone - 24X7 Home Shopping Channel
Naaptol Tamil - 24X7 Home Shopping Channel
Shop CJ Tamil - 24X7 Home Shopping Channel

Devotional
Aasta Tamil - Tamil Hindu spiritual channel.
Jothi TV - Tamil Hindu spiritual channel.
Nambikkai TV - Tamil Christian spiritual channel.
Sri Sankara TV - Tamil and Kannada Hindu spiritual channel.
SVBC 2 - Tamil Hindu spiritual channel.

High-Definition Channels
Colors Tamil HD
KTV HD
STAR Vijay HD
Star Vijay Super HD
Sun Music HD
Sun TV HD
Zee Tamil HD

References

Lists of television channels by language
 
Lists of television channels in India
Tamil-language mass media